Thomas Mandl (born February 7, 1979 in Eisenstadt) is an Austrian football goalkeeper, who currently plays for First Vienna in the Austrian Football First League.

Club career
He started his career at Austrian giants FK Austria Wien in 1997 where he broke into the first team in 2001. His good displays earned him a call up to the Austrian national team. He moved to Swiss League club FC Basel in 2004 but he failed to force his way into the team and was second choice behind Pascal Zuberbühler. In June 2005 he moved back on loan to Austria with VfB Admira Wacker Mödling and in autumn 2006 he had an unsuccessful trial at Vitesse Arnhem in the Dutch Eredivisie. In 2007, he signed for SK Schwadorf after a short spell in the Italian Serie C2 with Nuorese, in July 2008 moved to Trenkwalder Admira.

International career
He made his debut for Austria in a November 2002 friendly match against Norway and competed for the national jersey with Alex Manninger for 2 years. He earned 13 caps, no goals scored. His last international was an August 2004 friendly match against Germany.

National team statistics

Honours
Austrian Football Bundesliga (1):
 2003
Austrian Cup (1):
 2003
Swiss Super League (1):
 2005

External links
 Player profile - SK Schwadorf
 
 Profile - Austria Archive

References

Association football goalkeepers
Austrian footballers
Austria international footballers
FK Austria Wien players
SK Sturm Graz players
FC Basel players
FC Admira Wacker Mödling players
First Vienna FC players
Austrian Football Bundesliga players
Swiss Super League players
Expatriate footballers in Switzerland
Expatriate footballers in Italy
People from Eisenstadt
1979 births
Living people
Nuorese Calcio players
Footballers from Burgenland